For the Love of Sfiso Ncwane is an autobiography book by South African singer Sfiso Ncwane. It was released on November, 2018 by Izani Publishing. The book was written by Ayanda Ncwane. In this book Ayanda, tells a story of his late husband  Sfiso Ncwane his musical career and success.

References

2018 non-fiction books
Autobiographies
Music autobiographies